Belize requires its residents to register their motor vehicles and display vehicle registration plates. Current plates are North American standard 6 × 12 inches (152 × 300 mm).

Originally, Belize was a crown colony of Great Britain named British Honduras when license plates were first issued. In 1964 British Honduras was granted self government, and then in 1973 the country was renamed Belize. The 1973 license plates were the first to have the name Belize on them. Full independence from Great Britain took plate on 21 September 1981. The initials "C.A." on the plates stand for "Central America."

Location codes
The following table shows the abbreviations used on license plates for each of the six administrative districts in Belize.

There are also several cities that have their own codes. These are shown in the table below. Because they are known as the "Twin Towns" the codes for San Ignatio and Santa Elena both appear on the same license plate.

Passenger plates

Automobile Dealer plates

Agricultural and Commercial Truck plates

Governmental plates

Motorcycle plates

Taxi and Public Service plates

References

Belize
Transport in Belize
Belize transport-related lists